The 1969 EuroHockey Club Champions Cup was the first unofficial edition of Europe's premier field hockey club competition. It took place in Brussels as a group stage won by CD Terrassa.

Standings
  Club Egara
  MDA Roma
  SV Kampong
  Royal Leopold Club
  Warta Poznań
  FC Lyon
  Slavia Prague
  Lille Métropole HC

References

See also
European Hockey Federation

EuroHockey Club Champions Cup
International field hockey competitions hosted by Belgium
EuroHockey Club Champions Cup
EuroHockey Club Champions Cup
Sports competitions in Brussels